Răchiți is a commune in Botoșani County, Western Moldavia, Romania. It is composed of four villages: Cișmea, Costești, Răchiți, and Roșiori.

Natives
 Victor Babiuc
 Iacob Iacobovici

References

Communes in Botoșani County
Localities in Western Moldavia